This is a list of bridges and tunnels on the National Register of Historic Places in the U.S. state of New York.

References

 
New York
Bridges
Bridges